Libje lebje basta is a dish from Circassian cuisine, eaten mainly in the Düzce area by both Circassian and Turkish people. The ingredients are chicken, flour, garlic, onion, paprika, salt.

References

Turkish cuisine
Circassian cuisine